Sir John Eldon Bankes (17 April 1854 – 31 December 1947) was an English judge who worked in the Court of Appeal from 1915 to 1927.

He chaired the Royal Commission on the Private Manufacture of and Trading in Arms in 1935–1936.

Notes

1854 births
1947 deaths
20th-century English judges